Osakanh Thammatheva (born 13 March 1936 – died 31 October 2004) was a Laotian politician and member of the Lao People's Revolutionary Party. He was born in Voeunsai, Rattanakhiri province, Cambodia.

He was elected to the LPRP Central Committee at the 3rd National Congress and retained a seat on the body until his death on 31 October 2004.

References

Specific

Bibliography
Books:
 

1936 births
2004 deaths
Members of the 3rd Central Committee of the Lao People's Revolutionary Party
Members of the 4th Central Committee of the Lao People's Revolutionary Party
Members of the 5th Central Committee of the Lao People's Revolutionary Party
Members of the 6th Central Committee of the Lao People's Revolutionary Party
Members of the 7th Central Committee of the Lao People's Revolutionary Party
Members of the 6th Politburo of the Lao People's Revolutionary Party
Members of the 7th Politburo of the Lao People's Revolutionary Party
Government ministers of Laos
Lao People's Revolutionary Party politicians
Place of birth missing
People from Ratanakiri province